The Duke of Palmela (in Portuguese Duque de Palmela) is a Portuguese title granted by royal decree of Queen Maria II of Portugal, dated from October 18, 1850, to Dom Pedro de Sousa Holstein (1781-1850), a Portuguese politician during the first half of the 19th century. He was President of the Council of Ministers (Head of the Portuguese Government) and a remarkable Ambassador in London and to the Congress of Vienna.

The original title was Count of Palmela, granted by Queen Maria I, on April 11, 1812) which was successively upgraded to Marquis of Palmela (by King John VI on July 3, 1823) and to Duke of Faial (by Queen Maria II on April 4, 1836). The same Queen replaced the title of Duke of Faial by the new one of Duke of Palmela (October 18, 1850).

Family Name and Origins
The original family name associated with the House of Palmela is Sousa Holstein. More recently, they also use Sousa Holstein Beck.

They descend from the Sousa family (Lords of Calhariz) and, by female line, from the Dukes of Holstein. The 1st Duke of Palmela mother was Maria Anna Leopoldine, Princess of Schleswig-Holstein-Sonderburg-Beck.

List of the Dukes of Palmela
D. Pedro de Sousa Holstein (1781-1850)
D. Domingos de Sousa Holstein (1818-1864)
D. Maria Luísa Domingas de Sales de Borja de Assis de Paula de Sousa Holstein, (1841-1909)
D. Helena Maria de Sousa Holstein (1864-1941)
D. Domingos Maria do Espírito Santo José Francisco de Paula de Sousa Holstein-Beck (1897-1969)
D. Luís Maria da Assunção de Sousa Holstein-Beck (1919-1997)
D. Pedro Domingos de Sousa e Holstein-Beck (1951- )

Other Titles
This family holds several titles. All were granted by royal decree in the 19th century:
Marquis of Palmela, by decree of King John VI of Portugal, dated from July 3, 1823;
Marquis of o Faial by decree of Queen Maria II of Portugal, dated from December 1, 1834.
Marquis of Sousa Holstein by decree of King Pedro V of Portugal, dated from September 3, 1855;
Marquis of Monfalim by decree of King Luís I of Portugal, dated from August 9, 1861;
Marquis of Sesimbra by decree of King Luís I of Portugal, dated from February 2, 1864.
Baron of Teixeira by decree of King John VI of Portugal, dated from March 16, 1818;
Count of a Póvoa by decree of King John VI of Portugal, dated July 3, 1823;
Viscount of a Lançada by decree of Queen Maria II of Portugal, dated from January 10, 1849;
Count of Palmela, by decree of Prince Regent John of Portugal of his mother Queen Maria I of Portugal, dated from April 4, 1812;
Count of o Calhariz, by decree of King John VI of Portugal, dated from October 2, 1823;

See also
Dukedoms of Portugal
List of prime ministers of Portugal

External links
 Genealogy of the Dukes of Palmela

Bibliography
"Nobreza de Portugal e do Brasil" – Vol. III, page 99/106. Published by Zairol Lda., Lisbon 1989.
"A Casa Palmela", Pedro Urbano, Livros Horizonte, Lisbon 2008.

Portuguese nobility
Portuguese noble families
 
Dukedoms of Portugal
1850 establishments in Portugal